Arturo Naón (born 31 December 1912 in La Plata, died 5 May 1999) was an Argentine football (soccer) striker. He played 150 matches and scored 120 goals in the Primera División Argentina.

He is the top goal scorer of Gimnasia y Esgrima La Plata with 95 goals.

Clubs

1912 births
1999 deaths
Footballers from La Plata
Argentine footballers
Argentine Primera División players
Club de Gimnasia y Esgrima La Plata footballers
San Lorenzo de Almagro footballers
Racing Club de Avellaneda footballers
Argentina international footballers

Association football forwards